Përparim Kovaçi (born 8 January 1956 in Berat) is a former Albanian football player and coach who spent nearly all of his career at Tomori Berat, where he is the club's top goalscorer with over 100 league goals scored.

Club career
He was the Kategoria Superiore's top goalscorer in the 1979/80 season with 18 goals. He was loaned to Flamurtari for their 1980–81 Balkans Cup games against Velež Mostar and AEK Athens, scoring in both games against Velež.

International career
A fast striker, then national coach Loro Boriçi deemed him too small in build for the national team and preferred the likes of Albanian legends Arbën Minga and Agustin Kola.

References

1956 births
Living people
Sportspeople from Berat
Association football forwards
Albanian footballers
FK Tomori Berat players
Flamurtari Vlorë players
Kategoria Superiore players
Albanian football managers
FK Tomori Berat managers